Deferribacter thermophilus 	is an iron-reducing bacteria. 	It is a manganese- and iron-reducing bacterium. It is 	thermophilic and anaerobic bacterium, its type strain being 	designated as strain BMAT. The cells are straight to bent rods (1 to 	5 by 0.3 to 0.5 μm).

References

External links 
	LPSN

Type strain of Deferribacter thermophilus at BacDive -  the Bacterial Diversity Metadatabase

Deferribacterota
Bacteria described in 1997